Tomlinella insignis is a species of minute sea snail, a marine gastropod mollusk or micromollusk in the family Zebinidae.

Description

Distribution
This species occurs in the Indian Ocean off the Mascarene Basin.

References

 Drivas, J. & M. Jay (1988). Coquillages de La Réunion et de l'île Maurice

insignis
Gastropods described in 1850